The Laburnum Park Historic District is a national historic district located at Richmond, Virginia. The district encompasses 226 contributing buildings and 2 contributing structures located north of downtown Richmond.  The primarily residential area developed starting in the early-20th century as one of the city's early "streetcar suburbs" and as home to several important local institutions. The buildings are in a variety of popular early-20th century architectural styles including Queen Anne and Colonial Revival. It was developed as neighborhood of middle-to-upper-class, single-family dwellings.  Notable buildings include the Laburnum House (1908), Richmond Memorial Hospital (1954-1957), Richmond Memorial Hospital Nursing School (1960-1961), "The Hermitage" (1911), Laburnum Court (1919), Veritas School.

It was added to the National Register of Historic Places in 2002.

References

American middle class
American upper class
Streetcar suburbs
Historic districts on the National Register of Historic Places in Virginia
Queen Anne architecture in Virginia
Colonial Revival architecture in Virginia
Buildings and structures in Richmond, Virginia
National Register of Historic Places in Richmond, Virginia